The Sound of Nancy Wilson is a 1968 studio album by Nancy Wilson, originally subtitled "...An Experience in Motion and Emotion." It features a mixture of vocal jazz, soul, and popular music, and several prominent jazz instrumentalists perform on the album, including Benny Carter, Harry "Sweets" Edison, Shelly Manne, and pianist Jimmy Jones, who also serves as arranger and conductor. The song "Peace of Mind" was released as a single in October 1968.

Track listing

Side 1 

 "Out of This World" (Harold Arlen, Johnny Mercer) – 2:20
 "This Bitter Earth" (Clyde Otis) – 2:25
 "By Myself" (Arthur Schwartz, Howard Dietz) – 2:39
 "When the Sun Comes Out" (Arlen, Ted Koehler) – 3:47
 "Alone With My Thoughts Of You" (Ronnell Bright) – 3:54
 "It Only Takes A Moment" (Jerry Herman) – 3:14

Side 2 

 "Peace of Mind" (Delbert Millard, Nick Woods) – 2:39
 "The Other Side Of The Tracks" (Carolyn Leigh, Cy Coleman) – 2:11
 "Below, Above" (Gail Fisher, Oliver Nelson) – 3:20
 "The Rules Of The Road" (Leigh, Coleman) – 2:27
 "Black Is Beautiful" (Charles Wood, John Cacavas) – 4:11

Personnel 
From the liner notes:

 Nancy Wilson – vocals
 Jimmy Jones – piano, arranger, conductor
 Benny Carter – alto saxophone (solo on "When the Sun Comes Out")
 Harry "Sweets" Edison - trumpet
 Pete Candoli - trumpet
 Clyde Reasinger - trumpet
 John Audino - flugelhorn or trumpet
 Bob Bryant - flugelhorn or trumpet
 Dick Nash - trombone
 Tommy Pederson – trombone
 Chuck Cooper – trombone
 Edward Kusby – trombone
 Lew McCreary – trombone
 Kenny Shroyer – trombone
 Plas Johnson – tenor saxophone
 Chuck Gentry – woodwinds
 Bill Green – woodwinds
 Justin Gordon – woodwinds
 Arthur Herbert – woodwinds
 Donn Trenner – piano
 Buster Williams – bass
 Carol Kaye – electric bass
 Mundell Lowe – guitar
 Bob Bain – guitar
 Shelly Manne – drums
 Larry Bunker – percussion
 Victor Feldman – percussion
 Gene Estes – percussion

Technical personnel

 David Cavanaugh – producer
 Hugh Davies – engineer

Charts 
The album reached No. 20 on the Billboard Top R&B LPs chart and No. 122 on the Top Pop LPs chart.

The single "Peace of Mind", with "This Bitter Earth" as the B-side, peaked at No. 55 on the Billboard Hot 100 and No. 24 on the Hot Rhythm & Blues Singles chart.

References 

1968 albums
Nancy Wilson (jazz singer) albums
Capitol Records albums
Albums produced by Dave Cavanaugh
Albums arranged by Jimmy Jones (pianist)